Jowkar (also Romanized as Jowkār) is a village in Donbaleh Rud-e Shomali Rural District, Dehdez District, Izeh County, Khuzestan Province, Iran. At the 2006 census, its population was 284, in 61 families.

References 

Populated places in Izeh County